Yang Hyung-mo (양형모, born 23 March 1971) is a Korean former wrestler who competed in the 1996 Summer Olympics and in the 2000 Summer Olympics.

References

External links
 

1971 births
Living people
Olympic wrestlers of South Korea
Wrestlers at the 1996 Summer Olympics
Wrestlers at the 2000 Summer Olympics
South Korean male sport wrestlers
Olympic silver medalists for South Korea
Olympic medalists in wrestling
Wrestlers at the 1994 Asian Games
Wrestlers at the 1998 Asian Games
Medalists at the 1996 Summer Olympics
Asian Games competitors for South Korea
20th-century South Korean people
21st-century South Korean people